Haganes is a residential neighborhood of Kirkenes in Sør-Varanger, Norway.

Sør-Varanger